Xuzhang is a Loloish language of Yunnan, China. There are 2,000 speakers in Xuzhang, Wafang, Longyang District, Baoshan Prefecture.

References

Yang, Cathryn. 2010. Lalo regional varieties: Phylogeny, dialectometry, and sociolinguistics. Melbourne: La Trobe University PhD dissertation. http://arrow.latrobe.edu.au:8080/vital/access/HandleResolver/1959.9/153015.

Loloish languages